PV2 may refer to:

 3',4'-Methylenedioxy-α-pyrrolidinobutiophenone
 Private, An enlisted rank in the US Army